The 2005/06 FIS Freestyle Skiing World Cup was the twenty seventh World Cup season in freestyle skiing organised by International Ski Federation. The season started on 3 September 2005 and ended on 19 March 2006. This season included four disciplines: aerials, moguls, ski cross and halfpipe.

There were no dual mogul events on world cup calendar this season.

Men

Moguls

Aerials

Ski Cross

Halfpipe

Ladies

Moguls

Aerials

Ski Cross

Halfpipe

Men's standings

Overall 

Standings after 29 races.

Moguls 

Standings after 11 races.

Aerials 

Standings after 11 races.

Ski Cross 

Standings after 5 races.

Halfpipe 

Standings after 2 races.

Ladies' standings

Overall 

Standings after 29 races.

Moguls 

Standings after 11 races.

Aerials 

Standings after 11 races.

Ski Cross 

Standings after 5 races.

Halfpipe 

Standings after 2 races.

Nations Cup

Overall 

Standings after 58 races.

Men 

Standings after 29 races.

Ladies 

Standings after 29 races.

Footnotes

References

FIS Freestyle Skiing World Cup
World Cup
World Cup